Karl Sesta (18 March 1906 – 12 July 1974) was a footballer who represented both the Austrian and German national sides.

Club career
He played club football for Vorwärts XI, 1. Simmeringer SC, FK Teplice, Wiener AC, FK Austria Wien, LSV Markersdorf an der Pielach, First Vienna FC and SPC Helfort Wien.

International career
He made his debut for Austria in May 1932 against Czechoslovakia and he participated at the 1934 FIFA World Cup. He earned 44 caps for Austria, scoring one goal.

Honours
Mitropa Cup (1):
 1936

External links
Player profile - Austria Archive

References 

Austrian footballers
Austria international footballers
Austrian expatriate sportspeople in Germany
German footballers
Germany international footballers
Dual internationalists (football)
1934 FIFA World Cup players
FK Austria Wien players
First Vienna FC players
BC Augsburg managers
FC Red Bull Salzburg managers
1. Simmeringer SC players
1906 births
1974 deaths
Footballers from Vienna
Wiener Sport-Club managers
Association football defenders
German football managers